William Beauchamp may refer to:

William Beauchamp, American Roman Catholic priest and university administrator
Will Beauchamp, Canadian filmmaker
William Beauchamp, 1st Baron Bergavenny (1343–1411), English nobleman
William Beauchamp (MP for Westmorland), in 1420, MP for Westmorland
William Beauchamp (died c.1421), MP for Worcestershire
William Martin Beauchamp (1830–1925), American ethnologist and clergyman

See also
William de Beauchamp (disambiguation)
Sir William Beauchamp-Proctor, 3rd Baronet (1781–1861), British naval officer